Nelisiwe Faith Sibiya also known as Mbali Mthethwa from Durban Gen was born 13 September 1992.She is a South African actress and singer. She is best known for the role in the television series Durban Gen. She released an African cultured music called "Mama ka Bafana" in 2016

Personal life
Sibiya was born on 13 September 1992 in Johannesburg, South Africa. She grew up with her sister and mother. Her father was shot dead  when she was 8 years old in front of them. They lived with an uncle and an aunt, but later left the place after her sister and herself were sexually abused and one of the abuses was committed by her uncle. In January 2015, she enrolled to Tshwane University of Technology to study Musical Studies. Later, she got a bursary for the remaining two years. In 2016, her mother died before the graduation.

Career
Her mother came from a family of singers. With the help of her sister, Nelisiwe started her singing career. After her sister's death, she joined her high school choir. During this period in the choir, she received choral and classical training. Her first major playback singing came through the prison serial Lockdown with the theme song "Mama Ka Bafana" in 2018. Then in 2020, she was invited to play the lead role "Dr Mbali Mthethwa" in the e.tv. medical drama telenovela Durban Gen. For her role, she won the award for the Best Actress in Africa by the Zikomo Awards in 2021.

References

1992 births
Living people
South African television actresses